The Gravel Pit is a band from Boston's underground music scene, circa 1985–present.

Members Include:
Jedediah "Jed" Parish: Keys, Vocals
Ed Valauskas: Bass
Pete Caldes: Drums
Lucky Jackson: Guitar

They produced the following albums:
1. Crash Land
2. The Gravel Pit Manifesto
3. No One Here Gets In For Free
4. Silver Gorilla
5. Mass Avenue Freeze Out
6. Serpent Umbrella

Original works produced by Mike Deneen of Q Division Records.

Biography
In 1995, Jed Parish, Lucky Jackson, Ed Valauskas and Pete Caldes came to Boston as The Gravel Pit—an accomplished young rock band from New Haven, CT, seasoned by a few years of high-energy club gigs and a solid indie debut (Crash Land, on Feralette Records) based on influences like the Clash and The Undertones. Gradually incorporating a range of influences from mod to metal and invested with Parish's extraordinary gifts as a songwriter and singer, the band quickly generated a buzz on the Boston scene. Their early fans included such local pop stars as Kay Hanley and Jen Trynin, whose spirited support helped to bring the Pit to the attention of their Boston-based indie label, Q Division Records.

Within a year of their arrival in Boston, The Gravel Pit released the first of four Q Division releases. The Gravel Pit Manifesto (with pop-maestro producer Mike Denneen), was a brightly original, power-pop gem that earned them Best Indie Album and Best New Band at the 1996 Boston Music Awards. Their wildly energetic live shows and diverse catalogue of power-pop gems kept the momentum going strong for the next three years. They played hundreds of dates, opened for acts as diverse as Graham Parker, Cheap Trick, Gang of Four, Morphine, Guided By Voices, Nada Surf and They Might Be Giants and released three more records on Q,: 1997's full-length No One Here Gets In For Free—Rare and Unreleased 1989 - 1997;the 1998 hit single "Favorite," produced by Denneen; and 1999's full-length Silver Gorilla, also with Denneen, which amassed critical raves across the country, from Raygun to Entertainment Weekly. The Gravel Pit won the Boston Regional Poll at The 1st Annual Independent Music Awards.

After their national Silver Gorilla tour, without the big break of a major label deal and commercial exposure, the band decided to tone down their intense live performance schedule and spread out their efforts for a while. Valauskas, Jackson and Caldes formed The Gentlemen, a hugely popular hard-rock act, with Mike Gent of the Figgs. Parish has been exploring the vast and varied terrain of his musical tastes as a solo artist.

Their separate explorations did not diminish their collective chemistry. With the release of 2001's Mass Avenue Freeze-out on Q Division, The Gravel Pit came together to stake another claim as one of the most inspired power-pop outfits on the American independent music scene.

The Gravel Pit contributed a cover of the Miracle Legion song "Closer to the Wall" for the 2009 Mark Mulcahy tribute album "Ciao My Shining Star". It appears as a bonus track available on the deluxe edition. On September 20, 2009 Jed Parish, Ed Valauskas & Pete Caldes performed at the release party for the album with Frank Black and Ray Neal on Black's contribution to the album, 'Bill Jocko', at the Music Hall of Williamsburg. Valauskas, Caldes & Neal remained on stage to perform two Pixies songs 'Cactus' and 'Gouge Away'.

The band released their first album in 13 years, Serpent Umbrella, in 2014.

External links

 The Gravel Pit Facebook page

References 

American pop music groups
Independent Music Awards winners